Sir John Alexander Noble Graham, 4th Baronet,  (15 July 1926 – 11 December 2019) was a British diplomat who was ambassador to Iraq, Iran and NATO.

Career
Graham, born in Calcutta, British India, the only son of Sir Reginald Graham, 3rd Baronet, was at school at Eton College. He served in the Grenadier Guards from 1944 to 1947, receiving a commission as a second lieutenant on 27 July 1945, barely over a month before the end of the Second World War. Following his military service, he then went with a scholarship to Trinity College, Cambridge 1948–50. On leaving Cambridge he joined the Diplomatic Service and studied at the Middle East Centre for Arabic Studies before being posted to Bahrain in 1951, Kuwait in 1952 and Amman in 1953. He was Assistant Private Secretary to the Secretary of State for Foreign Affairs 1954–57 and then served at Belgrade 1957–60, Benghazi 1960–61, the Foreign Office 1961–66 and Kuwait 1966–69.

Graham was Principal Private Secretary to the Secretary of State for Foreign and Commonwealth Affairs 1969–72, serving Michael Stewart and Sir Alec Douglas-Home. He was then posted as Counsellor (later Minister) and Head of Chancery at Washington 1972–74; Ambassador to Iraq 1974–77; deputy Under-Secretary at the Foreign and Commonwealth Office (FCO) 1977–79; Ambassador to Iran 1979–80; deputy Under-Secretary again 1980–82; and finally Ambassador and Permanent Representative to NATO in Brussels 1982–86.

After retiring from the Diplomatic Service in 1986, Graham was Registrar of the Order of St Michael and St George 1987–2001 and was also Director of the Ditchley Foundation 1987–92.

Graham died on 11 December 2019 at the age of 93.

Honours
Graham was appointed a Companion of the Order of St Michael and St George in the 1972 Birthday Honours, knighted as a Knight Commander of the Order of St Michael and St George in the 1979 Birthday Honours on his appointment to Iran, and promoted to Knight Grand Cross of the Order of St Michael and St George in the 1986 New Year Honours. He succeeded to the baronetcy on the death of his father in 1980.

References

External links
Sir John Alexander Noble Graham, 4th Bt. – thepeerage.com

 

1926 births
2019 deaths
People educated at Eton College
Alumni of Trinity College, Cambridge
Grenadier Guards officers
Principal Private Secretaries to the Secretary of State for Foreign and Commonwealth Affairs
Ambassadors of the United Kingdom to Iraq
Ambassadors of the United Kingdom to Iran
Permanent Representatives of the United Kingdom to NATO
Knights Grand Cross of the Order of St Michael and St George
Baronets in the Baronetage of the United Kingdom
Members of HM Diplomatic Service
Military personnel of British India
British Army personnel of World War II
20th-century British diplomats